The geography of Chile is extremely diverse as the country extends from a latitude of 17° South to Cape Horn at 56° and from the ocean on the west to Andes on the east. Chile is situated in southern South America, bordering the South Pacific Ocean and a small part of the South Atlantic Ocean. Chile's territorial shape is among the world's most unusual. Chile reaches from the middle of South America's west coast straight down to the southern tip of the continent, where it curves slightly eastward. Diego Ramírez Islands and Cape Horn, the southernmost points in the Americas, where the Pacific and Atlantic oceans meet, are Chilean territory.

Physical geography

The northern two-thirds of Chile lie on top of the telluric Nazca Plate, which, moving eastward about ten centimeters a year, is forcing its way under the continental plate of South America. This movement has resulted in the formation of the Peru–Chile Trench, which lies beyond a narrow band of coastal waters off the northern two-thirds of the country. Although the ocean's surface obscures this fact, most of Chile lies at the edge of a profound precipice.

The same telluric displacements that created the Peru-Chile Trench make the country highly prone to earthquakes. During the twentieth century, Chile has been struck by twenty-eight major earthquakes, all with a force greater than 6.9 on the Richter scale. The strongest of these occurred in 2010 (registering an estimated 8.8 on the Richter scale) and in Valdivia 1960 (reaching 9.5). This latter earthquake occurred on May 22, the day after another major quake measuring 7.25 on the Richter scale, and covered an extensive section of south-central Chile. It caused a tsunami that decimated several fishing villages in the south and raised or lowered sections of the coast as much as two meters. The clash between the Earth's surface plates has also generated the Andes, a geologically young mountain range that, in Chilean territory alone, includes about 620 volcanoes, many of them active. Almost sixty of these had erupted in the twentieth century by the early 1990s. More than half of Chile's land surface is volcanic in origin.

About 80 percent of the land in Chile is made up of mountains of some form or other. Most Chileans live near or on these mountains. The majestically snowcapped Andes and their pre-cordillera elevations provide an ever-present backdrop to much of the scenery, but there are other, albeit less formidable, mountains as well. Although they seemingly can appear anywhere, the non-Andean mountains usually form part of transverse and coastal ranges. The former, located most characteristically in the near north and the far north natural regions, extend with various shapes from the Andes to the ocean, creating valleys with an east-west direction. The latter are evident mainly in the center of the country and create what is commonly called the Central Valley (Valle Central) between them and the Andes. In the far south, the Central Valley runs into the ocean's waters. At this location, the higher elevations of the coastal range facing the Andes become a multiplicity of islands, forming an intricate labyrinth of channels and fjords that have been an enduring challenge to maritime navigators.

Much of Chile's coastline is rugged, with surf that seems to explode against the rocks lying at the feet of high bluffs. This collision of land and sea gives way every so often to lovely beaches of various lengths, some of them encased by the bluffs. The Humboldt Current, which originates northwest of the Antarctic Peninsula (which juts into the Bellingshausen Sea) and runs the full length of the Chilean coast, makes the water frigid. A recent global remote sensing analysis suggested that there were 564km² of tidal flats in Chile, making it the 44th ranked country in the world in terms of tidal flat area.

Chilean territory extends as far west as Polynesia. The best known of Chile's Pacific Islands is Easter Island (Isla de Pascua, also known by its Polynesian name of Rapa Nui), with a population of 2,800 people. It is noted for its 867 monoliths (moais), which are huge (up to twenty meters high) and mysterious, expressionless faces sculpted of volcanic stone. They are famous for their lobster and the fact that one of the islands, Robinson Crusoe Island, is where Alexander Selkirk, the inspiration for Daniel Defoe's novel, was marooned for about four years.

Natural regions

Therefore, geographically, the country can be divided into many different parts. It is usually divided by geographers into five regions: the far north, the near north, central Chile, the south, and the far south. Each has its own characteristic vegetation, fauna, climate, and, despite the omnipresence of both the Andes and the Pacific, its own distinct topography.

The Far North

The far north (Norte Grande), which extends from the Peruvian border to about 27° south latitude, a line roughly paralleled to the Copiapó River, is extremely arid. It mainly contains the Atacama Desert, one of the driest areas in the world. In certain areas, this desert does not register any rainfall at all. Geographically, the aridity can be explained by the following conditions:

 The desert is located on the leeward side of the Chilean Coast Range, so little moisture from the Pacific Ocean can reach the desert.
 The Andes is so high that it blocks convective clouds, which may bring precipitation, formed above the Amazon Basin from entering the desert from the east.
 An inversion layer is created by the cold Humboldt current and the South Pacific High.

Average monthly temperatures range at sea level between about  during the summer and about  during the winter. Most of the population lives in the coastal area, where the temperatures are more moderate and the humidity higher. Contrary to the image of monochrome barrenness that most people associate with deserts, the landscape is spectacular, with its crisscrossing hills and mountains of all shapes and sizes, each with a unique hue depending on its mineral composition, its distance from the observer, and the time of day.

The Cordillera Domeyko in the north runs along the coast parallel to the Andes. This topography generates coastal microclimates because the fog that frequently forms over the cold ocean waters, as well as any low clouds, is trapped by the high bluffs. This airborne moisture condenses in the spines and leaves of the vegetation, droplets that fall to the ground and irrigate the plants' roots. Beyond the coastal bluffs, there is an area of rolling hills that encompasses the driest desert land; this area ends to the east with the Andes towering over it. The edges of the desert in some sections have subterranean aquifers that have permitted the development of forests made up mainly of tamarugos, spiny trees native to the area that grow to a height of about twenty-five meters. Most of those forests were cut down to fuel the fires of the many foundries established since colonial times to exploit the abundant deposits of copper, silver, and nitrate found in the area. The result was the creation of even drier surface conditions.

The far north is the only part of the country in which there is a large section of the Andean plateau. During summer the area receives considerable rainfall in what is commonly known as the "Bolivian winter," forming shallow lakes of mostly saline waters (Salar de Llamara, Salar des Miraje, Salar de Atacama) that are home to a number of bird species, including the Chilean flamingo. Some of the water from the plateau trickles down the Andes in the form of narrow rivers, many of which form oases before being lost to evaporation or absorption into the desert sands, salt beds, and aquifers. However, some rivers do manage to reach the Pacific, including the Loa River, whose U-shaped course across the desert makes it Chile's longest river. The water rights for one of the rivers, the Lauca River, remain a source of dispute between Bolivia and Chile. These narrow rivers have carved fertile valleys in which exuberant vegetation creates a stark contrast to the bone-dry hills. In such areas, roads usually are built halfway up the arid elevations in order to maximize the intensive agricultural use of the irrigated land. They offer spectacular panoramic vistas, along with the harrowing experience of driving along the edges of cliffs.

In the far north, the kinds of fruits that grow well in the arid tropics thrive, and all kinds of vegetables can be grown year-round. However, the region's main economic foundation is its great mineral wealth. For instance, Chuquicamata, the world's largest open-pit copper mine, is located in the far north. Since the early 1970s, the fishing industry has also developed lots in the main ports of the area, most notably Iquique and Antofagasta.

The Near North

The near north (Norte Chico) extends from the Copiapó River to about 32° south latitude, or just north of Santiago. The near north is also subject to droughts. The temperatures are moderate, with an average of  during the summer and about  during the winter at sea level. The winter rains and the melting of the snow that accumulates on the Andes produce rivers whose flow varies with the seasons, but which carry water year-round. Their deep Transverse Valleys provide broad areas for cattle raising and, most important, fruit growing, an activity that has developed greatly since the mid-1970s. Nearly all Chilean pisco is produced in the near north.

As in the far north, the coastal areas of the near north have a distinct microclimate. In those sections where the airborne moisture of the sea is trapped by high bluffs overlooking the ocean, temperate rain forests develop as the vegetation precipitates the vapor in the form of a misty rain. Because the river valleys provide breaks in the coastal elevations, maritime moisture can penetrate inland and further decrease the generally arid climate in those valleys. The higher elevations in the interior sections are covered with shrubs and cacti of various kinds.

Central Chile

Central Chile (Chile Central), home to a majority of the population, includes the three largest metropolitan areas—Santiago, Valparaíso, and Concepción. It extends from about 32° south latitude to about 37° south latitude. The climate is of the temperate Mediterranean type, with the amount of rainfall increasing considerably and progressively from north to south. The numerous rivers greatly increase their flow as a result of the winter rains and the spring melting of the Andean snows, and they contract considerably in the summer. The combination of abundant snow in the Andes and relatively moderate winter temperatures creates excellent conditions for Alpine skiing.

The topography of central Chile includes a coastal range of mountains running parallel to the Andes. Lying between the two mountain ranges is the so-called Central Valley, which contains some of the richest agricultural land in the country, especially in its northern portion. The area just north and south of Santiago is a large producer of fruits, including the grapes from which the best Chilean wines are made. Exports of fresh fruit began to rise dramatically in the mid-1970s because Chilean growers had the advantage of being able to reach markets in the Northern Hemisphere during winter in that part of the world. Most of these exports, such as grapes, apples, and peaches, go by refrigerator ships, but some, such as berries, go by air freight.

The southern portion of central Chile contains a mixture of some excellent agricultural lands, many of which were covered originally with old-growth forests. They were cleared for agriculture but were soon exhausted of their organic matter and left to erode. Large tracts of this worn-out land, many of them on hilly terrain, have been reforested for the lumber, especially for the cellulose and paper industries. New investments during the 1980s in these industries transformed the rural economy of the region. The pre-Andean highlands and some of the taller and more massive mountains in the coastal range (principally the Cordillera de Nahuelbuta) still contain large tracts of old-growth forests of remarkable beauty, some of which have been set aside as national parks. Between the coastal mountains and the ocean, many areas of central Chile contain stretches of land that are lower than the Central Valley and are generally quite flat. The longest beaches can be found in such sections.

The South

Although many lakes can be found in the Andean and coastal regions of central Chile, the south (Sur de Chile) is definitely the country's most lacustrine area. Southern Chile stretches from below the Bío-Bío River at about 37° south latitude to Chacao channel at about 42° south latitude. In this lake district of Chile, the valley between the Andes and the coastal range is closer to sea level, and the hundreds of rivers that descend from the Andes form lakes, some quite large, as they reach the lower elevations. They drain into the ocean through other rivers, some of which (principally the Calle-Calle River, which flows by the city of Valdivia) are the only ones in the whole country that are navigable for any stretch. The Central Valley's southernmost portion is submerged in the ocean and forms the Gulf of Ancud. Isla de Chiloé, with its rolling hills, is the last important elevation of the coastal range of mountains.

The south is one of the rainiest areas in the world. Temperatures in the area are moderate. In Valdivia, the two summer months average , whereas the winter months average .

The snow-covered Andes form a constant backdrop to vistas of clear blue or even turquoise waters, as at Todos los Santos Lake. The rivers that descend from the Andes rush over volcanic rocks, forming numerous white-water sections and waterfalls. The vegetation, including many ferns in the shady areas, is a lush green. Some sections still consist of old-growth forests, and in all seasons, but especially in the spring and summer, there are plenty of wildflowers and flowering trees. The pastures in the northernmost section, around Osorno, are well suited for raising cattle; milk, cheese, and butter are important products of that area. All kinds of berries grow in the area, some of which are exported, and freshwater farming of various species of trout and salmon has developed, with cultivators taking advantage of the abundant supply of clear running water. The lumber industry is also important. A number of tourists, mainly Chileans and Argentines, visit the area during the summer.

Many of Chile's distinctive animal species have been decimated as they have been pushed farther and farther into the remaining wilderness areas by human occupation of the land. This is the case with the huemul, a large deer, and the Chilean condor, the largest bird of its kind; both animals are on the national coat of arms. The remaining Chilean cougars, which are bigger than their California cousins, have been driven to isolated national parks in the south by farmers who continue to hunt them because they occasionally kill sheep and goats.

The Far South

In the far south (Chile Austral), which extends from between 42° south latitude to Cape Horn, the Andes and the South Pacific. In the northern part of the far south, there is still plenty of rainfall. The summer months average , whereas the winter months average . The area generally is chilly and wet and houses a combination of channels, fjords, snow-capped mountains, and islands of all shapes and sizes within a narrow space. The southern part of the far south includes the city of Punta Arenas, which, with about 125,000 inhabitants, is the most southern city in Chile. It receives much less precipitation; its annual total is only , or a little more than what Valdivia receives in the month of June alone. This precipitation is distributed more or less evenly throughout the year, with the two main summer months receiving a monthly average of thirty-one millimeters and the winter months , some of it in the form of snow. Temperatures are colder than in the rest of the country. The summer months average , and the winter months average . The virtually constant wind from the South Pacific Ocean makes the air feel much colder.

The far south contains large expanses of pastures that are often used for raising sheep, even though overgrazing is an issue in some areas. The area's other main economic activity is oil and natural gas extraction from the areas around the Strait of Magellan. This strait is one of the world's important sea-lanes because it unites the Atlantic and Pacific oceans through a channel that avoids the rough open waters off Cape Horn. The channel is perilous, however, and Chilean pilots guide all vessels through it.

Area and boundaries
Area:
Total:

Land:

Water:

Note:
includes Easter Island (Isla de Pascua) and Isla Sala y Gómez

This does not include the Chilean claims to Antarctica, which overlap with Argentinian and British claims. All Antarctic claims are frozen under the Antarctic treaty.

Area - comparative:
Canada: roughly half the size of Quebec
US: slightly smaller than twice the size of Montana

Land boundaries:
total:

border countries:
Argentina , Bolivia , Peru 

Chile's largest and second largest international borders are the: Argentina–Chile border and Bolivia–Chile border, respectively.

Coastline:

Maritime claims:
Territorial sea:

Contiguous zone:

Exclusive economic zone:

Continental shelf:

Extremes

Latitude and longitude
 North: tripartite border with Bolivia and Peru
 Southernmost point can be either:
 Mainland: Águila Islet, Diego Ramírez Islands
 Including Antártica: The South Pole
 Westernmost point: Motu Nui, off Easter Island
 Easternmost point can be either:
 Mainland: Nueva Island
 Including Antártica: the 53rd meridian west over Antarctica

Elevation
highest point: Ojos del Salado 
lowest point: Pacific Ocean

Resources and land use
Natural resources:
copper, timber, iron ore, nitrates, precious metals, molybdenum, hydropower, thermal power, nutrient-rich ocean currents

Land use:
arable land:
1.80%
permanent crops:
0.61%
other:
97.59% (2012)

Irrigated land:
 (2003)

Total renewable water resources:
922 km3 (2011)

Freshwater withdrawal (domestic/industrial/agricultural):
total:
26.67 km3/yr (4%/10%/86%)
per capital:
1,603 m3/yr (2007)

Environmental concerns

Natural hazards:
severe earthquakes; active volcanism; tsunamis

Environment - current issues:
widespread deforestation, mining; air pollution from industrial and vehicle emissions; water pollution from raw sewage.

Environment - international agreements:
party to:
Antarctic Treaty, Antarctic-Environmental Protocol, Biodiversity, Climate Change, Desertification, Endangered Species, Environmental Modification, Hazardous Wastes, Law of the Sea, Marine Dumping, Nuclear Test Ban, Ozone Layer Protection, Ship Pollution (MARPOL 73/78), Wetlands, Whaling
signed, but not ratified:
Climate Change-Kyoto Protocol

Geography - note:
strategic location relative to sea lanes between Atlantic and Pacific Oceans (Strait of Magellan, Beagle Channel, Drake Passage); Atacama desert is one of world's driest regions

Population geography

Demographics

Urban population 
The distribution of population is very condensed around the capital, Santiago, where approximately 90% of the people live. The cities of Valparaiso and Concepcion are the next highly populated cities, in that order. The population is 87.6% urbanized. In 2009, 12,037,290 living in urban parts of Chile actually had functioning facilities in their home, while 403,276 people did not have proper facilities in their dwelling. 100% of the urban population has some form of access to sanitation facilities, while 90.9% of rural people have these facilities available. This is much higher than the rural average for the world that is at 50.5% access to sanitation facilities.

The United Nations Department of Economic and Social Affairs note the average annual rate of population change from 2015 to 2017 is 1.022. The UN data also shows live births per woman (2015-2017) averaging 1.765 and combined infant mortality rate for both sexes at 6.258 per 1,000 live births.

Natural hazards
Push factors for Chilean emigrants include natural disasters. Earthquakes are common in Chile due to the country's location on the Nazca Plate and South American Plate. Chile notoriously had some of the most powerful earthquakes in history with the Valdivia Earthquake in 1960 at 9.5 on the Richter scale and the Maule Earthquake at 8.8 in 2010. The top three countries that Chilean emigrants are moving to are Argentina, Peru, and the United States.

Chile's natural hazards include earthquakes, volcanic eruptions, and tsunamis. The natural hazards are attributed to Chile's location along the Ring of Fire. Severe earthquakes can trigger tsunamis for this country with 6,435 km of coastline. There are also more than three-dozen active volcanoes in Chile with the most active being the Llaima in the north Chilean Andes.

Urban geography 
The three most populated cities in Chile are Santiago, Valparaíso, and Concepción. The populations of these cities are: Santiago at 6,680,000, Valparaíso at 967,000 and Concepción at 857,000. Santiago is located in central Chile with the Mapocho River running through the city. Valparaíso is located on the coast about 116 km northwest of Santiago. Concepción is also a coastal city that lies near the mouth of the Biobío River.

Origins 

Industrial cities, such as Concepción and Talcahuano, began as colonial centers in the 1600s. Most of the large cities in Chile began as settlement locations for Spanish colonists living in homes constructed from adobe. They have grown to be the densely populated urban conurbations they are known for today.

Gentrification 
Gentrification is occurring in the municipal district of Santiago, which is impacting low income residents. Housing availability has reduced by 50% for residents and rent for new apartments has increased, changing the average income of that location. Floor Area Ratio instigated by the state has resulted in highly dense and smaller living spaces.

Cultural geography

Racialized landscapes in Chile 
Due to Chile's high population density in urban cities like Santiago, housing developments started developing upwards. These high rises see an abundance of foreign migrants as occupants.

Religious landscapes and sacred places 
In Chile, there are a number of pilgrimage and devotional sites dedicated to Catholic or cult's saints. These include the Church of Our Lady of Andacollo, the Church of Our Lady at Mount Carmel at Tirana, and the Church of the Immaculate Conception of Lo Vásquez.

La Virgen de Andacollo 
While there are several different tales of her origin and variations on her name, the Virgin Andacollo is flaunted on the first Sunday of every month in the plaza of Andacollo, Chile. The Virgin Andacollo is the Patron Saint of miners who heals the sick and rescues those lost in the mines. On the first Sunday of October, the town of Andacollo celebrates their saint with La Fiesta Chico. Thousands of pilgrims come to the northern Chilean town each December for La Fiesta Grande. This event lasts from December 23 to 27. This celebration attracts as many as 500,000 people a year.

Animitas 
It is not uncommon to come across roadside shrines in Chile. These shrines are called Animitas and they are  particularly common along rural highways or in lower-income towns. The shrines can be devoted to saints or those who died tragically. These animitas identify the spot where a body and soul were separated and where a soul might linger.

Churches of Chiloé 

The Chiloé archipelago is located in southern Chile and is home to the Churches of Chiloé. These churches date back to the early 17th century. Their history began when the first Jesuits arrived in Chile. There are more than 60 churches, but 16 of them are recognized as world heritage sites by UNESCO as well as national monuments in Chile. The Achao church is the oldest church that still stands and was built entirely without using nails.

Political geography

Border disputes with Bolivia 
Chile has long been in conflict with Bolivia over coastal and land sovereignty. The War of the Pacific was fought between Chile, Bolivia, and Peru in the late 1800s. The latter two  had rich nitrate deposits. However, Peru established a monopoly over their deposits and Bolivia applied export tariffs to Chile. After the war, Chile had won 120,000 km2 of land that included Antofagasta on the coastline of Bolivia. This has left Bolivia landlocked since 1904. 
Bolivians still fights for coastal and territorial sovereignty. Evo Morales, the former president of Bolivia, has argued that Bolivia's landlocked status has made the country endure great "historical injustice". Morales also has argued that were Chileans to give back Antofagasta, it would have no significant effect on their country. The land Bolivia lost to Chile more than a century ago is now home to some of the biggest copper mines in the world. Chile has no intention of giving up any land to Bolivia, but is very open to coastal access negotiations.

In October 2018, the International Court of Justice ruled against Bolivia in its dispute with Chile. The court ruled that Chile did not have to discuss granting Bolivia sea access.

Border disputes with Peru 
There have been long arguments between Chileans and Peruvians since the 1800s. This is because they both claim boundary coastal lines. Peruvians claim the Northern part of Chile, which is now South West of Peru. The "triangulation" was made to fix the boundary problem between Chile and Peru. The decisions were accomplished on January 27, 1839, by the International Court of Justice  The War of the Pacific was in the years 1879-1883. This  was caused because of the minerals resources Chile had. This led for Chile to control Sea Shipping to Peru and send out an army to invade Peru on October 8, 1879. The attempt was also made to The United States but failed badly on October 1880. There was a resistance between Peruvians and Chileans for a few years. The United States offered help with a treaty for both Peru and Chile, better known as the Treaty of Ancón. This was signed by both of them on October 20, 1883, to keep the peace between them. In 2008, Peru took Chile to court over their maritime disputes. In 2014, the International Court of Justice's ruling resulted in Chile losing 80 miles from Chile's northwestern ocean zone. This ruling severely impacted fishers in the country.

Border disputes with Argentina 
Chile despite being a small country has had borders disputes with other countries as well. One of those countries is Argentina. The border disputes between Chile and Argentina deal with the Patagonia region. One of the many disputes deals with the Southern ice-fields. The disagreements began when Argentina maps started to include part of the southern ice-fields. The dispute between these two countries deals with water, as this contested land contains one of the biggest (Second largest) reserves of potable water in the world. Despite these differing ideas about what land belongs to which country, the President of Chile claims that these issues will get resolved.

Agricultural geography

Agriculture comprises 4.4% of GDP (industry 31.4%, services 64.3%). A 2017 estimate has 8.881 million people working within the Chilean labor force, and 9.2% working within agriculture by occupation. Chile's labor force places fifty-ninth in the country comparison list according to the CIA World Factbook.  Chile currently utilizes 14,015 Hectares of agricultural land. Chilean agriculture includes the cultivation and trade of grapes, apples, pears, onions, wheat, corn, oats, peaches, garlic, asparagus, and beans. Grapes are the largest fruit export product with an export value of $1.76 billion. Non-animal foods, fruit, and vegetable exports total about $11.7 billion. Beef and poultry industries, fish, wool and timber are also included. Animal products have an export value of $5.89 billion. Water heavy industries are causing groundwater, lake, and river depletion in Chile. Illegal water extractions are now becoming common in Chile. Exploiting the country's water has been detrimental to the citizens and animals that rely on these sources of water.

Climate and weather 
Located on the west coast of South America, Chile has a total area of 756,102 km2. There are four climates that separate Chile. One of these climates is the dry climate. This is located the north above Santiago, the Atacama Desert has temperatures of up to 90 °F. The central part of Chile has a warmer climate that reaches up to 82.4 °F. The inner region of Chile has a snow climate. South of Chile there is a wet climate because of the Mediterranean coastline this leading the wet season to range from May to August. Summer in Chile lasts from December through February. Winter lasts from June through August with low temperatures up to -2 °C.

Land use
As of 2011, Chile allocates 21.1% of its land to agriculture. Chile's allocation percentage is smaller than its neighboring countries Argentina (53.9%) and Bolivia (34.3%), but larger than Peru's (18.8%). Of the land Chile devotes to agriculture, only 1.7% is arable land. Chile's diverse climate and small area is responsible for such a low percentage. Some desert countries like Egypt have a higher arable land percentage than Chile.

Economic geography 
Chile maintains a market-oriented economy with high levels of foreign trade compounded by strong financial institutions. These factors have given Chile the highest sovereign bond rating in South America. Chile is committed to a trade liberalization and has 26 trade agreements covering 60 different countries. In May 2010 Chile became the first South American member of OECD (Organisation for Economic Co-operation and Development). Chile's top 3 importing partners are China, the United States, and Brazil. In November 2005, Chile and China signed the China-Chile Free Trade Agreement. More than 90% of Chile's imports enter China duty-free.
The United States-Chile Free Trade Agreement began in 2004. Since 2015, 100% of U.S. imports have been entering Chile duty-free. Consumer and Industrial export products enter Chile duty-free as well. Since 2017, Chile and Brazil have been negotiating a trade deal that's on track to be signed by the end of 2018. Chile's top three exporting partners are China, the United States, and Japan. Chile and Japan were previously in Economic Partnership Agreements. In 2018, Chile and Japan were among the eleven nations that signed the Comprehensive and Progressive Agreement for the Trans-Pacific Partnership. This trade pact aims to reduce tariffs, enforce environmental standards, and remove barrier regulations.

See also 

Climate of Chile
Fjords and channels of Chile
Geology of Chile
List of islands of Chile
List of lakes of Chile
List of rivers of Chile
List of volcanoes in Chile

Notes

References

External links
 
 
 
 

 United States Hydrographic Office, South America Pilot (1916)
 Geographic Chart of the Kingdom of Chile by Alonso de Ovalle